is a Japanese figure skater. He is a three-time Olympic medalist (2018 silver, 2022 bronze, 2022 team bronze), the 2022 World champion and a two-time World silver medalist (2018, 2017), the 2022–23 Grand Prix Final champion, the 2019 Four Continents champion, the 2017 Asian Winter Games champion, and a five-time Japanese national champion (2016–2019, 2022).

Earlier in his career, he became the 2015 World Junior champion, 2014–15 Junior Grand Prix Final champion, and 2012 Youth Olympic silver medalist.

Uno is the first skater to successfully land a quadruple flip, and the second skater behind Yuzuru Hanyu to land a quadruple loop in an international competition.

He is also the historic record-holder for the highest score by a junior in the short program.

Personal life
Shoma Uno was born on 17 December 1997, in Nagoya, Japan. He was born prematurely, weighing only 900 grams and fitting in the palm of his father's hand.  He has a younger brother, Itsuki. Since 2019 he has been sponsored by Mizuno.

Career

Early years
Uno started skating when he was five because of Mao Asada, who talked to him at a skating rink. His figure skating idol is Daisuke Takahashi. Uno won bronze at the Japan Junior Championships of the 2009–2010 season but did not finish on the podium in either of the next two years.

Junior career

2011–2012 season: Junior international debut
Uno made his Junior Grand Prix (JGP) debut in the 2011–2012 season, winning a bronze medal at the JGP Tallinn Cup in Estonia after placing 4th at the event in Poland. At the 2012 Winter Youth Olympics, he won silver in the individual event and gold in the team event. He finished 10th at the 2012 World Junior Championships.

Uno was invited to skate in the gala at the 2012 World Team Trophy as the silver medalist in Winter Youth Olympics.

2012–2013 season
Uno finished 6th at his Junior Grand Prix in Slovenia. At his next JGP event in Germany, he won the silver medal with personal bests in both programs and a total score of 188.48 points. He finished 7th at the 2013 World Junior Championships.

2013–2014 season: Senior international debut
Uno competed in his third JGP season, winning the bronze medal in Riga, Latvia, and placing 4th in Tallinn, Estonia. He placed 5th at the 2014 World Junior Championships and won his first international senior competition at the 2014 Gardena Spring Trophy.

2014–2015 season: World Junior champion

Uno began his season by winning his second senior international competition at the 2014 Asian Trophy. He was assigned to the JGP events in Japan and Croatia. He placed second in Japan and first in Croatia with new personal best scores and qualified for his first JGP Final. He won his first junior national title at the 2014–15 Japan Junior Championships. The following month, he won gold at the JGP Final, placing third in the short program and winning the free skate while setting junior world records for the free skate and combined total. At the 2014–15 Japan Championships, he placed 3rd in both segments of the competition, winning the silver medal.

Uno made his senior ISU Championship debut at the 2015 Four Continents; he placed second in the short program, fifth in the free skate, and fifth overall, setting personal best scores in all segments. He ended his season by winning the 2015 World Junior Championships, winning the short program with a junior world record score of 84.87, and placing second in the free skate. He became the fifth Japanese man to win the junior world title.

As the junior worlds champion, Uno was invited to skate in the gala at the 2015 World Team Trophy.

Senior career

2015–2016 season: First quad flip in international competition

Uno started his season with a 5th-place finish at the 2015 U.S. Classic, placing 9th in the short program but winning the free skate. He then went on to win the individual event of the 2015 Japan Open, defeating World champions Javier Fernandez, Brian Joubert and Patrick Chan.

Making his senior Grand Prix debut, Uno won the silver medal at 2015 Skate America after placing fourth in the short program and first in the free program, finishing only 1.52 points behind gold medalist Max Aaron. Uno then made some training changes, saying, "During Skate America, I felt that I lacked a bit of stamina, so I increased the number of run-throughs in training every day and started to do off-ice stamina training." He placed first in the short program at the 2015 Trophée Éric Bompard. Due to the November 2015 Paris attacks, the free skate was cancelled, and the short program standings were deemed the final results. Uno thus became the winner of the event and qualified for the 2015–16 Grand Prix Final in Barcelona. He was awarded the bronze medal in Spain behind Yuzuru Hanyu and Fernández.

After repeating as the national silver medalist, Uno finished fourth behind Patrick Chan, Jin Boyang and Yan Han at the 2016 Four Continents Championships, having ranked second to Jin in the short program and fifth in the free skate. At the 2016 World Championships in Boston, he placed 4th in the short program, 6th in the long, and 7th overall. At the 2016 Team Challenge Cup, Uno became the first skater ever to land a quadruple flip at an international competition. He landed two quads in his short program, 4F and 4T-3T combination, and scored a personal best of 105.74 points.

2016–2017 season: First national title, World silver medal

In December 2016, Uno was fourth in the short program with 86.82 points after falling on his quadruple toe loop and failing the combination in the Grand Prix Final. He rallied back in the free skate with a personal best of 195.69 points and placed second in that segment. He placed third overall and won the bronze medal for the second consecutive year, just 0.34 points behind silver medalist Nathan Chen and 11.39 points behind gold medalist Yuzuru Hanyu. Later that month, he won his first national title in Osaka, Japan.

In February, he broke the hundred-point barrier with a score of 100.28 in the short program for the first time in his career at the Four Continents Championships, being the fourth person to do so. In the free skate, he landed four quad jumps, including his first ever quad loop in international competition and a quad flip, but fell on both his triple axel combinations. He placed 2nd in the short program, 3rd in the free skate and won the bronze medal with a score of 288.05 behind Nathan Chen and Yuzuru Hanyu.

At the 2017 World Figure Skating Championships in Helsinki, he set new personal best scores for both the short program with a score of 104.86 and free skate with a score of 214.45, earning the silver medal with the fourth-ever highest combined score of 319.31, just 2.28 points behind World Champion Yuzuru Hanyu and 15.73 points ahead of bronze medalist Jin Boyang.

At the final competition of this season, the World Team Trophy in Tokyo, he was able to win a gold medal for Japan with his teammates. He won the short program with 103.53 points and placed second behind teammate Yuzuru Hanyu in the free skate with 198.49 points. He scored a total of 302.02 points, the highest in the men's event.

2017–2018 season: Olympic silver medal

Uno began his season by winning the gold medal at his challenger series event at the 2017 Lombardia Trophy in Bergamo, Italy while setting new personal bests in all segments. At the 2017 Japan Open, he won the silver medal with his teammates. Uno won the gold medal at 2017 Skate Canada, placing first in both segments to begin his Grand Prix Series for the season. After returning from the competition on 31 October, Uno suffered from a 39-degree high fever and was diagnosed with influenza. In his following competition at 2017 Internationaux de France, he placed second in the short program and first in the free skate to place second overall behind Javier Fernandez. His results qualified him for his third consecutive senior Grand Prix Final, where he won the silver medal only 0.5 points behind Nathan Chen.

At the 2017 Japan Figure Skating Championships, Uno successfully defended his national title.  On 24 December 2017, it was announced that Uno would represent Japan at the 2018 Four Continents Figure Skating Championships in Taipei City, Chinese Taipei, 2018 Winter Olympics in Pyeongchang, South Korea, and 2018 World Figure Skating Championships in Milan, Italy. Placing third in the short program and third in the free skate, Uno took silver at the 2018 Winter Olympics, 1.66 points ahead of bronze medallist Javier Fernández of Spain.

At the 2018 World Figure Skating Championships in Milan, Uno had to leave practice only after a few minutes on ice and was carried to a bus on a staff member's back. Upon examination, no serious injury was found; his skates caused his pain. However, it was decided that Uno would still compete in the competition. Uno scored 94.26 in the short program, and 179.51 in the free skate, with a total score of 273.77, earning him the silver medal. His result, together with that of Kazuki Tomono, secured three spots for Japanese men at the 2019 World Figure Skating Championships to be held in Saitama, Japan.

2018–2019 season: Four Continents champion 
Uno started the season at the 2018 CS Lombardia Trophy, where he won the event. At 2018 Japan Open, he won the men's free program and won the gold medal as a member of Team Japan. In October, he won his first GP event of the season 2018 Skate Canada International. In November, he won his second GP event of the season, the 2018 NHK Trophy. He qualified to the 2018–19 Grand Prix Final and placed second, 5.99 points behind Nathan Chen.

At the 2018 Japan Figure Skating Championships, Uno successfully defended his national title, winning by a margin of almost 50 points. This was his third successive national title, despite spraining his right ankle during the competition. He was named to the team to represent Japan at the 2019 Four Continents Championships and the 2019 World Championships.

At the 2019 Four Continents Championships, Uno came fourth in the short program, first in the free skate, and first overall. This marked the first time he won a major international competition after having placed silver at all of them at least once. He set a world record for the free skate with a score of 197.36.

At the 2019 World Championships in Saitama, Uno was sixth in the short program, fourth in the free skate, and fourth overall. After the competition, he expressed disappointment with his performances. He concluded the season at the 2019 World Team Trophy, placing third in the short program, third in the free skate, and third overall. In the free skate, he attempted a triple Axel-quadruple toe loop combination, becoming the first skater to attempt this combination in competition, although he was unable to land it successfully. Team Japan won the silver medal.

On 6 June 2019, Uno announced on his website that he would no longer be coached by Machiko Yamada and Mihoko Higuchi, who had coached him since he was five years old, and that he did not yet know who his new coaches would be. On 7 June, Russian coach Eteri Tutberidze announced that Uno would be attending her summer camp. Following Tutberidze's camp, which he described as "tough" but a "good experience", Uno announced that he would not have a main coach in the near term, but Takeshi Honda would serve as a jump coach. He also announced plans to visit Stéphane Lambiel's Swiss training facility in September 2019.

2019–2020 season: Coaching change, struggles, and fourth Japanese title 
Uno began the season at the 2019 CS Finlandia Trophy. He narrowly placed second in the short program behind countryman Sōta Yamamoto but came first in the free skate to take the gold medal.

Beginning the Grand Prix at the 2019 Internationaux de France, Uno placed fourth in the short program after falling on both his triple Axel and a quad toe loop attempt that was meant to be in combination. In the free skate, he fell three times and had errors on two other quad jump attempts, causing him to place ninth in the free skate and fall to eighth overall. This was his worst-ever result at a senior international competition. Despite this, Uno stated that he had positive feelings about his situation and expressed gratitude to the audience for their cheers and support. Uno spent the weeks between the Internationaux and his next assignment, the 2019 Rostelecom Cup, training with Stéphane Lambiel. He placed fourth in the short program, falling on an under-rotated quad flip, and described himself as "relieved" with the result. Fourth in the free skate as well, he remained in fourth overall, 0.63 points behind bronze medalist Makar Ignatov. Uno said it was "not a good result, but I feel that towards the end of the season, I’ll be able to jump a quad flip." He announced he would train more in Switzerland before the Japanese championships.

Shortly before the 2019–20 Japan Figure Skating Championships, Uno confirmed that he would train full-time under Lambiel.  He placed second in the short program behind Yuzuru Hanyu, who was competing at his first Japanese championships since the 2016–17 season.  Uno then won the free skate and the gold medal overall, his first individual victory over Hanyu in his career.

He then decided not to participate in the Four Continents Championships of 2020. Instead, he started in February at the Challenge Cup in the Netherlands, where he won the gold medal and scored 290.41 points overall. He was assigned to end the season at the World Championships in Montreal, but these were cancelled as a result of the coronavirus pandemic.

2020–2021 season 
Uno was assigned to compete at the 2020 Internationaux de France, but this event was also cancelled due to the pandemic.

Returning to Japan for the 2020–21 Japan Championships, Uno placed third in the short program behind Yuzuru Hanyu and Yuma Kagiyama after failing to execute his planned jump combination.  He was second in the free skate, his only error being tripling a planned quad toe loop, and he rose to the silver medal position overall, behind Hanyu.

At the 2021 World Championships, Uno placed sixth in the short program after a fall on his triple Axel. In the free skate, he two-footed his quadruple Salchow and put a hand down for his quadruple toe loop but still managed to place third in the free skate and fourth overall, behind Nathan Chen and compatriots Hanyu and Kagiyama. Uno was subsequently announced as part of the Japanese team for the 2021 World Team Trophy. He placed ninth in the short program and sixth in the free program, with Team Japan placing third overall at the competition.

2021–2022 season: Beijing Olympics and World title 
Uno made his season international competitive debut at the 2021 Skate America, his first Grand Prix. He placed second in the short program behind Vincent Zhou despite doubling a planned quad flip, in the process landing a quad-triple combination in competition for the first time in years. He was third in the free skate but remained in the silver medal position, less than a point ahead of bronze medalist Nathan Chen, who struggled in both programs. Zhou and Uno became the first skaters to defeat Chen in competition since the prior Olympics. His second assignment was the 2021 NHK Trophy, which, due to the withdrawal of Yuzuru Hanyu due to injury, was widely seen as a rematch between Uno and Zhou. Uno won both segments of the competition to defeat Zhou by almost thirty points. He landed four of his five planned quad jumps in the free skate, albeit with an imperfect landing on one, and doubled a planned quad flip. Uno's results qualified him to the Grand Prix Final, but it was subsequently cancelled due to restrictions prompted by the Omicron variant.

At the 2021–22 Japan Championships, Uno placed second in the short program and third in the free skate to take the silver medal behind Yuzuru Hanyu. He was named to his second Japanese Olympic team. Uno began the Games as the Japanese entry in the men's short program of the Olympic team event, as he had done four years earlier. Skating cleanly, he placed second behind the United States' Chen with a new personal best of 105.46, securing nine points for the Japanese team. Longtime coach Stéphane Lambiel was unable to accompany him as he had tested positive for COVID-19 and remained in Switzerland. Team Japan would go on to take the bronze medal, its first in the team competition and Uno's second Olympic medal. Two days later, Uno placed third in the short program of the men's event, managing another new personal best of 105.90 despite making an error on his jump combination. A somewhat rougher free skate saw him place fifth in that segment, but remain in third overall, taking the bronze, his third Olympic medal.

Uno concluded his season at the 2022 World Championships in Montpellier. With both Chen and Hanyu absent due to injury, Olympic medalists Uno and Yuma Kagiyama were rated as top contenders for the gold medal. Uno skated a clean short program and was rewarded with a personal best score of 109.63 and first place in the segment, 3.94 points ahead of Kagiyama. Uno made two jump errors in the free skate, but easily won that segment and the World title, becoming the third Japanese man to do so. He said afterward, "I wanted to have a performance that made my coach Stephane Lambiel proud. I was able to achieve that, and I haven't won too often, so I'm very happy about that."

2022–2023 season: Grand Prix Final champion 
Eschewing the Challenger series, Uno made his season debut as part of Team Japan at the Japan Open. Uno finished first in the men's free skate competition, 0.38 points ahead of American Ilia Malinin, while Japan won the gold medal. Uno praised the younger Malinin, who had recently attracted considerable media attention for being the first ever to land a quad Axel, saying that he "will be devastating in a year or two" and that he hoped to be able to keep up with him.

Uno once again began the Grand Prix at Skate Canada International, winning his third gold medal by a margin of almost eight points over Kao Miura. At the 2022 NHK Trophy on home ice in Sapporo, Uno fell on his attempted jump combination and placed second in the short program, behind Sōta Yamamoto. He rallied in the free skate, overtaking Yamamoto to win his third NHK title. Despite this, he expressed dissatisfaction with his performance due to both jump errors and some omitted choreographic details. Qualifying to the Grand Prix Final once again, he finished first in the short program in Turin despite performing only a quad-double jump combination. He won the free skate with a new personal best score, landing five quadruple jumps successfully and winning the Grand Prix Final title for the first time and completing his first Career Grand Slam. He claimed that he "didn't particularly feel pressure just because I won the World Championship, but at this competition, especially during the free program, all the other skaters did so amazing that instead, it motivated me to enjoy and do my best for my competition." He vowed to continue improvements, in particular, to resume performing quad-triple combinations.

Uno finished in first place in the short program of the men's event at the 2022–23 Japan Championships. Despite performing only a quad-double jump combination, he had a lead of almost thirteen points over training partner Koshiro Shimada, who was second in the segment. He attempted five quads in the free skate, cleanly landing three, winning that segment as well and taking his fifth national title. Uno attracted some attention afterward for criticizing the lack of transparency in the Japanese federation's criteria for awarding berths to the World Championships, interpreted by the media as a reference to Shimada not being selected despite winning the national silver medal.

Records and achievements
 First skater in history to successfully land a quadruple flip jump at the 2016 Team Challenge Cup. This achievement is recognized by Guinness World Records.
 Became the first Japanese Figure skater to win three Olympic Medals at the 2022 Beijing Olympics
 Set the junior-level men's record for the short program score with 84.87 points at the 2015 Junior Worlds.
 Set the junior-level men's record for the combined total with 238.27 points at the 2014–15 Junior Grand Prix Final. Record was broken by Cha Jun-hwan at the 2016 JGP Japan.
 Set the junior-level men's record for the free program score with 163.06 points at the 2014–15 Junior Grand Prix Final. Record was broken by Daniel Samohin at the 2016 World Junior Championships.
Set the men's record for the short program score with 104.15 points at the 2018 CS Lombardia Trophy. Record was broken by Yuzuru Hanyu at the 2018 Grand Prix of Helsinki.
Set the men's record for the combined total with 276.20 points at the 2018 CS Lombardia Trophy. Record was broken by Nathan Chen at the 2018 Skate America.
Set the men's record for the free program score with 197.36 points at the 2019 Four Continents Championships. Record was broken by Yuzuru Hanyu at the 2019 World Championships.

Honors and awards
Japan Skating Federation: "JOC Cup" (2019)
Chunichi Shimbun: 33rd "Chunichi Sports Award" (2019)
TV Asahi: "Big Sports Awards" Big Sports Special Award (2017, 2018)
Aichi "Sports Awards" (2017, 2018)
Nagoya "Sports Awards" (2018, 2023)
Toyota, Aichi "Sports Awards" (2022)

Programs

Competitive highlights
GP: Grand Prix; CS: Challenger Series; JGP: Junior Grand Prix

2006–07 to 2010–11

Detailed results
Small medals for short and free programs are awarded only at ISU Championships. At team events, medals are awarded for team results only. T – team result. P – personal/individual result. Current ISU world bests highlighted in bold and italic. Personal bests are highlighted in bold.

Senior level

Junior level

Notes

References

External links

shoma-uno.com 

! colspan="3" style="border-top: 5px solid #78FF78;" |World Record Holders

Japanese male single skaters
Figure skaters at the 2017 Asian Winter Games
Medalists at the 2017 Asian Winter Games
Asian Games gold medalists for Japan
Figure skaters at the 2012 Winter Youth Olympics
1997 births
Living people
Figure skaters from Nagoya
Figure skaters at the 2018 Winter Olympics
Figure skaters at the 2022 Winter Olympics
Olympic figure skaters of Japan
Olympic bronze medalists for Japan
Olympic silver medalists for Japan
Medalists at the 2018 Winter Olympics
Medalists at the 2022 Winter Olympics
Olympic medalists in figure skating
Asian Games medalists in figure skating
World Junior Figure Skating Championships medalists
Four Continents Figure Skating Championships medalists
World Figure Skating Championships medalists
20th-century Japanese people
21st-century Japanese people